Under the Skin is a 2013 science fiction film directed by Jonathan Glazer, and written by Glazer and Walter Campbell as a loose adaptation of Michel Faber's 2000 novel of the same name.  It received praise from critics, particularly for Scarlett Johansson's performance, Glazer's directorial style, and Mica Levi's score. It was named one of the best films of 2014 and one of the best films of the decade by many critics and publications.

Accolades

Legacy
Under the Skin appeared on numerous critics' and filmmakers' lists of the decade's best films:

 1st – Little White Lies
 1st – Robbie Collin, The Telegraph
 1st – Tim Robey, The Telegraph 
 1st – Simon Abrams, RogerEbert.com
 1st – Justine Smith, RogerEbert.com
 1st – Susannah Gruder, Reverse Shot 
 1st – La Septième Obsession 
 2nd – Joshua Rothkopf, Time Out New York
 2nd – IndieWire
 2nd – Tara Brady and Donald Clarke, The Irish Times 
 2nd – Patrick Gamble, Kinoscope 
 2nd – Derek Smith, Slant Magazine
 3rd – Geoff Berkshire, The Los Angeles Times
 3rd – The Skinny 
 4th – Scott Tobias, The A.V. Club
 4th – Noel Murray, The A.V. Club
 4th – Matt Prigge 
 5th – Jessica Green, Film Comment
 5th – Les Inrockuptibles
 6th – Time Out
 6th – Keith Phipps, The A.V. Club 
 6th – Paste
 7th – RogerEbert.com 
 7th – HyperAllergic
 7th – Consequence of Sound 
 8th – Eric Henderson, Slant Magazine
 9th – Cahiers du Cinéma    
 9th – Charles Bramesco, The A.V. Club 
 10th – Justin Chang, The Los Angeles Times
 10th – Slant Magazine 
 10th – Ty Burr, The Boston Globe 
 9th – The A.V. Club
 11th – Film Comment 
 11th – Adam Kempenaar, Filmspotting 
 12th – Ashley Clark, Film Comment
 14th – The International Cinephile Society
 15th – João Pedro Rodrigues, Cahiers du Cinéma
 15th – Jesse Hassenger, The A.V. Club
 15th – Vulture 
 17th – Beatriz Loayza, The A.V. Club
 18th – Brian Tallerico, RogerEbert.com
 20th – Joanna Di Mattia, Seventh Row 
 Unranked – Kleber Mendonça Filho, Cahiers du Cinéma
 Unranked – Alice Winocour, Cahiers du Cinéma
 Unranked – Monia Chokri, Cahiers du Cinéma 
 Unranked – Olivier Père, Arte TV

References

External links
 

Lists of accolades by film
Horror film lists